The Neoplan Skyliner is a double-deck multi-axle luxury touring coach built by German coach manufacturer Neoplan. It was introduced in 1967.

History

In 1964, the founder's second son, Konrad Auwärter, developed a double-deck design for a service bus as part of his dissertation.  The 'Do-Bus' design had extremely low weight, and could carry over 100 passengers. It also featured a low-frame front axle with forward-mounted steering gear that permitted a low flat floor.  The double-deck principle was applied to coach design, creating a revolutionary high-capacity comfortable vehicle for touring. This vehicle became known as the Skyliner, and created an image for the company that differentiated the Neoplan brand from its competitors, and created interest in its products across Europe.

A second manufacturing facility opened in Pilsting in 1973, and a third opening in Kumasi, Ghana, in December 1974 to support a large order.

The Spaceliner, introduced in 1979 took the Cityliner concept of passenger floor level above the driver, and extended the actual floor above the cab.

US
In 1989, its subsidiary Neoplan USA introduced a domestically produced version of the Skyliner as the AN122/3, which designated the manufacturer (American Neoplan), model (122), and number of axles (3). Production in the United States qualified the bus for federal subsidies according to the requirements of the Buy America Act. The AN122/3 was available with Detroit Diesel Series 60 engines and Allison B500 transmissions which are fitted typically to transit buses, allowing the double-decker bus to share spares inventory and maintenance facilities with the rest of the bus fleet.

Adoption of the Skyliner occurred mainly in California. AC Transit in Oakland, California evaluated one AN122/3 in April 1983 but did not proceed with a fleet purchase. The Southern California Rapid Transit District of Los Angeles operated Neoplan USA Skyliners during the 1980s and early 1990s. Antelope Valley Transit Authority also operated Skyliners on their Lancaster-Los Angeles route during the late 1990s and early 2000s.

UK
The Neoplan Skyliner also gained popularity in the United Kingdom. Stagecoach bought some right-hand drive Skyliners during the 1980s to facilitate its new coaching division developed during the company's early years. In 2004, it bought 25 more N122/3L Skyliners for its modern coaching divisions the Oxford Tube and Megabus. Trathens Travel Services of Plymouth also bought some Skyliners in 2005 for its National Express contracts. However, many of these were displaced following the accident with a National Express Skyliner (see below) - when some Plaxton Panthers were bought in 2007.

Japan

The Neoplan Skyliner has also gained popularity primarily as a long-distance/overnight and sightseeing bus in Japan ever since Chūō Kōtsū Bus Osaka (ja:中央交通 (大阪府)) bought its first such bus in 1979. Many Neoplan Skyliner buses in Japan use domestically produced powertrains and engines such as those from Nissan Diesel or Isuzu.

Accidents
In March 2003, near Nažidla in South Bohemian Region a Neoplan Skyliner overturned on Czech European route E55, killing nineteen people and one man died two years later due to the injuries sustained in the crash. Thirty-four people were injured. It was the biggest bus accident in history of the Czech Republic.

In May 2003, a Neoplan Skyliner overturned on a French highway, killing twenty-eight people. A report by French investigators recommended that drivers of double-deck coaches should receive special training because of the vehicle's relative instability. A separate study, presented to the United Nations Economic Commission for Europe in the same year reported that high-sided coaches were much more likely to overturn in crashes than standard single-deck coaches. The German manufacturer added a safety system, known as electronic stability control, which brakes each wheel separately to prevent overturning, in 2006.

In January 2007 a Neoplan Skyliner operated by National Express overturned and crashed on the M25 motorway near Heathrow Airport, killing two passengers; a third passenger died six-months later due to the injuries sustained in the crash. The company temporarily withdrew all twelve Skyliners from service pending investigations The crash was deemed to have been caused by travelling at excessive speed and the driver was charged with three counts of causing death by dangerous driving. He was subsequently jailed for five years and banned from driving for three years. No safety issues were found. The electronic stability control system which had been introduced on new vehicles in 2006 was not used on this vehicle.

Specifications
The Neoplan Skyliner has undergone a process of evolution in specification since its 1967 introduction. The Skyliner C was designed to seat 69 passengers plus two crew (driver and steward), whereas the Skyliner L seated 77 plus two.

For the powertrain detail, current Skyliners use a MAN diesel engine sourced from Neoplan parent company MAN Nutzfahrzeuge AG. This Euro VI rated diesel fueled internal combustion engine is the 12.5 litre MAN D2676 LOH 02 straight-six (R6) common rail turbodiesel with intercooler, which displaces , and utilises four valves per cylinder and cylinder-direct fuel injection. It uses a Bosch EDC7 electronic engine control unit, and also uses a 'PM-KAT' catalytic converter. The engine is mounted upright in a longitudinal orientation at the rear of the coach, and transmits its output to the rear roadwheels via a twelve-speed TipMatic ZF AS Tronic automated manual transmission.

An interesting design on the Skyliner is its 'tag' third axle. This is able to articulate, during steering movements - and this helps reduce tyre wear, which can afflict dual rear axle vehicles.  It features disc brakes all round, and utilises independent suspension on the front and trailing third axles, whilst the driven axle is a solid version.

Standard safety features include 'electronically regulated braking system' (EBS) with braking assistant (BA) and Electronic Stability Programme (ESP).  It also features a speed-limiting device called 'maximum speed control' (MSC), and is fitted with an accident data recorder (ADR).  An optional feature is the 'lane guard system' (LGS), which will vibrate the drivers seat should the coach drift out of its lane.

Gallery

References

External links

Neoplan Skyliner - official website

Coaches (bus)
Skyliner
Double-decker buses
Vehicles introduced in 1964
Tri-axle buses